NCAA Division II independent schools are teams that compete in NCAA ice hockey but are not members of a conference. There are currently no independents at the Division II level, however, several teams were previously independents while under D-II classification.

Current independent programs
As of 2020, only seven teams play at the Division II level with all belonging to the same conference (Northeast-10 Conference).

Current programs which were previously independent
The NCAA did not start numerical classification until 1973. Prior to that teams played either in the University Division, which became Division I, or the College Division, which was split into Divisions II and III. College Division independents are listed here for reference as a majority of the College Division programs joined the Division II level regardless of where their respective schools were reclassified.

During the 1960s and 70s most western schools competed in the NAIA and did not fall under the jurisdiction of the NCAA. This began to change once the NCAA instituted the Division II Tournament in 1978. In some cases NCAA teams were invited to participate in the NAIA tournament, leaving the ordering of schools at that time unclear.

Men

† played as an independent prior to the formal creation of lower-tier ice hockey in 1964.

Women

Defunct teams

Men

† played as an independent prior to the formal creation of lower-tier ice hockey in 1964.

Women

See also
 List of NCAA Division II ice hockey programs
 NCAA Division II independent schools
 NCAA Division I independent schools (ice hockey)
 NCAA Division III independent schools (ice hockey)

References

NCAA Division III Independents
Independents, ice hockey

Ice
Independent